Family with sequence similarity 120C is a protein in humans that is encoded by the FAM120C gene.

This gene encodes a potential transmembrane protein and lies in a region where mutations and deletions have been associated with intellectual disability and autism. Alternative splicing results in multiple transcript variants. [provided by RefSeq, Aug 2011].

References

Further reading